The women's 100 metre backstroke event at the 1968 Olympic Games took place between 22 and 23 October. This swimming event used backstroke.  Because an Olympic-size swimming pool is 50 metres long, this race consisted of two lengths of the pool.

Records
Prior to this competition, the existing world and Olympic records were as follows.

The following new world and Olympic records were set during this competition.

Results

Heats
Heat 1

Heat 2

Heat 3

Heat 4

Heat 5

Heat 6

Semifinals
Semifinal 1

Semifinal 2

Final

Key: WR = World record

References

Women's backstroke 100 metre
1968 in women's swimming
Women's events at the 1968 Summer Olympics